Schistostephium griseum is a species of plant from southern Africa.

Description

Growth form 
It is covered in silky white hairs.

Leaves 
The leaves are alternately arranged. They are most common on young branches, but some also grow on the main branch. They are pinnately with three to seven linear lobes and an entire margin. The margins are often thickened and roll inswards. They sometime grow directly on the branches and sometimes have a midrib that lacks lamina at the base. When present, the laminas are more or less oval shaped and pinnately dissected. While the laminas have glands, these are often hidden by hairs. These hairs are the most dense along the midrib and veins.

Flowers 
Bright yellow flowers are present in December. They are disc-shaped and borne on long brown-haired stalks. Hairy bracts subtending the flowerhead are sometimes present. All the flowers are hermaphroditic.

The involucre is broad ( and shallowly bell-shaped. It is made of about 45 bracts. They are variable in shape and size and are often translucent towards the tips. They are densely hairy below. The hairs are pale when they dry.

The receptacle (the central part f the flower that holds the pollen) is hollow and domed.The anthers have inconspicuous collars and turn white when they dry. The lobes are slightly rounded due to a dense layer of hairs.

Fruits 
The fruits are achenes (dry and singe seeded fruits) sparsely covered with glands. Hairs are sparse, or more commonly absent. There is no pappus.

Distribution and habitat 
This plant is endemic to South Africa, Eswatini, Lesotho and Mozambique. It is also found at the edges of forests.

Conservation 
This species is considered to be of least concern by the South African National Biodiversity Institute. While it is declining in parts of its range due to habitat loss and degradation, it has a large enough range to not yet be at risk of extinction.

References 

Plants described in 1916
Flora of South Africa
Flora of Mozambique
Flora of Swaziland
Flora of Lesotho
Anthemideae